Paris Davis (born 13 May 1939) is a retired United States Army officer who received the Medal of Honor on 3 March 2023 for his actions on 18 June 1965 during the Vietnam War. He was twice previously recommended for the Medal of Honor, but both times the paperwork relating to his recommendation disappeared. Davis, then a captain with the 5th Special Forces Group, was instead awarded the Silver Star. He subsequently commanded the 10th Special Forces Group.

Early life
Davis studied political science at Southern University on a Reserve Officers' Training Corps scholarship.

Military career
Davis was commissioned as a Reserve Component officer on 1 June 1959, and earned Airborne and Ranger qualifications in 1960, and Special Forces qualification in 1962. His initial overseas tours included South Korea, South Vietnam (1962–1963) and Okinawa, Japan. 

Davis arrived for his second tour in South Vietnam in April 1965 and took command of 5th Special Forces Group A-team A-321 at Camp Bồng Sơn, Bình Định Province, II Corps.

On 18 June 1965, Davis and three of his Special Forces team led the Army of the Republic of Vietnam (ARVN) 883rd Regional Forces Company in an attack on a Viet Cong (VC) base. The following account was written by Davis:We had just finished a successful raid on a Viet Cong Regimental Headquarters, killing upwards of one hundred of the enemy. The raid had started shortly after midnight. We had four Americans and the 883rd Vietnamese Regional Force Company participating in the raid. After the raid was completed the first platoon of the 883rd Company broke and started to run just about the same time I gave the signal to pull in the security guarding the river bank. I went after the lead platoon, MSG Billy Waugh was with the second platoon, SSG David Morgan was with the third platoon and SP-1 Brown was with the fourth platoon. It was just beginning to get light (dawn) when I caught up to the first platoon and got them organized and we were hit by automatic machine gun fire. It was up front and the main body of the platoon was hit by the machine gun. I was hit in the hand by a fragment from a hand grenade. About the time I started moving the platoon back to the main body, I heard firing and saw a wounded friendly VN soldier running from the direction of the firing. He told me that the remainder of the 883rd Company was under attack. I moved the platoon I had back towards the main body. When I reached the company, the enemy had it pinned down in an open field with automatic weapons and mortar fire.

I immediately ordered the platoon I had to return the fire, but they did not – only a few men fired. I started firing at the enemy moving up and down the line, encouraging the 883rd Company to return the fire. We started to receive fire from the right flank. I ran down to where the firing was and found five Viet Cong coming over the trench line. I killed all five and then I heard firing from the left flank. I ran down there and saw about six Viet Cong moving toward our position. I threw a grenade and killed four of them. My M16 jammed, so I shot one with my pistol and hit the other with my M16 again and again until he was dead.

MSG Waugh started to yell that he had been shot in the foot. I ran to the middle of the open field and tried to get MSG Waugh, but the Viet Cong automatic fire was too intense and I had to move back to safety. By this time SSG Morgan, who was at the edge of the open field, came to. He had been knocked out by a VC mortar round. He told me that he was receiving sniper fire. I spotted the sniper and shot him in his camouflaged manhole. I crawled over and dropped a grenade in the hole killing two additional Viet Cong.

I was able at this time to make contact with the FAC CPT Bronson and SGT Ronald Dies. CPT Bronson diverted a flight of 105's and had them drop their bombs on the enemy's position. I ran out and pulled SSG Morgan to safety. He was slightly wounded and I treated him for shock. The enemy again tried to overrun our position. I picked up a machine gun and started firing. I saw four or five of the enemy drop and the remaining ones break and run. I then set up the 60mm mortar, dropped about five or six mortars down the tube and ran out and tried to get MSG Waugh. SSG Morgan was partially recovered and placing machine gun fire into the enemy position. I ran out and tried to pick up MSG Waugh, who had by now been wounded four times in his right foot. I tried to pick him up, but I was unable to do so. I was shot slightly in the back of my leg as I ran for cover. By this time CPT Bronson had gotten a flight of F-4s. They started to drop bombs on the enemy. I ran out again and this time was shot in the wrist, but I was able to pick up MSG Waugh and carried him fireman style, in a hail of automatic weapon fire, to safety. I called for a MEDEVAC for MSG Waugh. When the MEDEVAC came I carried MSG Waugh about  up over a hill. As I put MSG Waugh on the helicopter, SFC Reinburg got off the ship and ran down to where the 883rd Company was located. He was shot through the chest almost immediately. I ran to where he was and gave him first aid. With SSG Morgan's help I pulled him to safety.

The enemy again tried to overrun our position. I picked up the nearest weapon and started to fire. I was also throwing grenades. I killed about six or seven. I was then ordered to take the troops I had and leave. I informed the Colonel in the C&C ship that I had one wounded American and one American I didn't know the status of. I informed the Colonel that I would not leave until I got all the Americans out. SFC Reinburg was MEDEVACed out. The fighting continued until mid-afternoon. We could not get the Company we had to fight. The enemy tried to overrun our position two more times. We finally got reinforcements and with them I was able to go out and get SP-1 Brown who lay out in the middle of the field some fourteen hours from the start until the close of the battle.

Davis received the Silver Star and the Purple Heart for his efforts in this action.

The Bồng Sơn area remained a VC stronghold and U.S., ARVN and South Korean forces would mount Operation Masher there from 24 January to 6 March 1966.

Davis served a third tour in Vietnam in 1969, and later commanded the 10th Special Forces Group and retired from the army as a colonel in 1985.

Medal of Honor Recommendation
Davis was recommended for the Medal of Honor in 1965; however, the Army lost the recommendation. In 1969 an inquiry was ordered and it found no record of the original recommendation. The recommendation was resubmitted and lost again. It has been suggested that racism was a factor, given that Davis is African-American.

In January 2021 then Acting Secretary of Defense Christopher C. Miller ordered an expedited review of the lost recommendation, to be completed by March 2021. In a June 2021 editorial Miller wrote that the military bureaucracy was again stalling the review and urged President Joe Biden to award Davis the Medal of Honor. In November 2022 it was reported that the recommendation had been approved by Chairman of the Joint Chiefs of Staff, General Mark Milley, and was awaiting approval by Secretary of Defense Lloyd Austin. On 14 February 2023, it was confirmed that Davis would finally receive the Medal of Honor.

Later life
Davis published the Metro Herald newspaper in Virginia for 30 years. He is now retired and lives in Arlington County, Virginia.

In 2019 Davis was inducted into the U.S. Army Ranger Hall of Fame.

Medal of Honor
On 1 March 2023 it was announced that President Joe Biden would present the Medal of Honor to Davis on 3 March 2023 in a ceremony at the White House.

The text of Davis's Medal of Honor citation reads:

The President of the United States of America, authorized by Act of Congress, March 3rd, 1863, has awarded in the name of Congress the Medal of Honor to Captain Paris D. Davis, United States Army, for conspicuous gallantry and intrepidity at the risk of his own life above and beyond the call of duty.

Captain Paris D. Davis, Commander, Detachment A-321, 5th Special Forces Group (Airborne), 1st Special Forces, distinguished himself by acts of gallantry and intrepidity above and beyond the call of duty while serving as an advisor to the 883rd Regional Force Company, Army of the Republic of Vietnam, during combat operations against an armed enemy in the vicinity of Bồng Sơn, Republic of Vietnam on June 17th through 18th, 1965.

Captain Davis and three other U.S. Special Forces advisors accompanied the Vietnamese 883rd Regional Force Company on its first combat mission, a daring nighttime raid against a Viet Cong regional headquarters housing a superior enemy force.

Captain Davis’s advice and leadership allowed the company to gain the tactical advantage, allowing it to surprise the unsuspecting enemy force and kill approximately 100 enemy soldiers.  While returning from the successful raid, the regional force company was ambushed and sustained several casualties.

Captain Davis consistently exposed himself to the hostile armed — small arms fire to rally the inexperienced and disorganized company.  He expertly directed both artillery and small arms fire, enabling other elements of the company to reach his position.

Although wounded in the leg, he aided in the evacuation of other wounded men in his unit, but refused medical evacuation himself.  Following the arrival of air support, Captain Davis directed artillery fire within 30 meters of his own position in an attempt to halt the enemy’s advance. 

Then, with complete disregard for his own life, he braved intense enemy fire to cross an open field to rescue his seriously wounded and immobilized team sergeant.  While carrying the sergeant up the hill to a position of relative safety, Captain Davis was again wounded by enemy fire.

Despite two painful wounds, Captain Davis again refused medical evacuation, remained with the troops, fought bravely, and provided pivotal leadership and inspiration to the regional force company as they repelled several Viet Cong assaults on their position over a period of several hours.

When friendly reinforcements finally arrived, Captain Davis again refused medical evacuation until he had recovered a U.S. advisor under his command who had been wounded during the initial ambush and presumed dead.

While personally recovering the wounded soldier, he found him severely wounded but still clinging to life.  Captain Davis directed the helicopter extraction of his wounded colleague not leaving the battlefield himself until after all friendly forces were recovered or medically evacuated.

Captain Davis’s heroism and selflessness above and beyond the call of duty, at the risk of his own life, are in keeping with the highest traditions of military service and reflect great credit upon himself, his unit, and the United States Army.

Other decorations
His other decorations include: Silver Star 15 December 1965; Soldier's Medal for Heroism 16 December 1968; Bronze Star Medal with V Device and Oak Leaf Cluster 13 April 1966; Defense Meritorious Service Medal; Meritorious Service Medal with Oak Leaf Cluster; Air Medal with V device and numeral "2" 25 November 1969; Joint Service Commendation Medal; Army Commendation Medal with V device and three Oak Leaf Clusters 29 May 1968; Purple Heart with Oak Leaf Cluster; National Defense Service Medal; Armed Forces Expeditionary Medal; Vietnam Service Medal; Humanitarian Service Medal; Master Parachutist Badge; Expert Infantryman Badge; Combat Infantry Badge;Ranger Tab; Special Forces Tab; Joint Chiefs of Staff Identification Badge; Republic of Vietnam Civil Actions Medal First Class; Meritorious Unit Commendation; Presidential Unit Citation; Republic of Vietnam Gallantry Cross with Palm 15 May 1968, with Silver Star 29 May 1965, with Bronze Star 16 June 1965, with Gold Star 16 May 1965; Republic of Vietnam Armed Forces Honor Medal First Class 15 May 1968; Expert Marksmanship Badge; Rifle M-16 with Bar

References

External links
C-Span video of Medal of Honor award ceremony
US Army profile

1939 births
Living people
21st-century African-American people
African Americans in the Vietnam War
African-American United States Army personnel
United States Army personnel of the Vietnam War
United States Army Medal of Honor recipients
Vietnam War recipients of the Medal of Honor
Recipients of the Silver Star
Recipients of the Soldier's Medal
Editors of Virginia newspapers
Southern University alumni
People from Arlington County, Virginia
Military personnel from Virginia